Obdulio Diano (October 27, 1919 in Bernal, Argentina – February 19, 2007 in Mar del Plata, Argentina) is a former Argentine footballer who played for clubs of Argentine and Chile.

Teams
 Argentino de Quilmes 1939
 Santiago National 1940
 Colo-Colo 1941-1943
 Boca Juniors 1944-1952

Titles
 Colo-Colo 1941 (Chilean Championship)
 Boca Juniors 1944 (Argentine Championship)

External links
 

1919 births
2007 deaths
Argentine people of Italian descent
Argentine footballers
Argentine expatriate footballers
Argentina international footballers
Boca Juniors footballers
Colo-Colo footballers
Argentine Primera División players
Expatriate footballers in Chile
Argentine expatriate sportspeople in Chile
Copa América-winning players
Santiago National F.C. players
Association football goalkeepers
Sportspeople from Buenos Aires Province